Quico or Quicos may refer to:

People 
 Quico (footballer) (José Antonio Ruiz Palácios, born 1961), former Spanish soccer player
 Quico Canseco (born 1949), American politician
 Quico Chacón (born 1934), former professional footballer who played in the Costa Rican Primera División and Mexican Primera División
 El Quico, Francesc Sabaté Llopart, a Catalan anarchist
  (born 1962), band member of Berrogüetto
 Quico Cortés, Spanish field hockey player

Other uses 
 Quico (El Chavo del Ocho), a character in the Chavo del 8 and the Federrico series, played by Carlos Villagrán.
 Quicos, a name for corn nuts

See also
 Keiko (disambiguation)
 Kiko (disambiguation)